Tmesisternus quadrimaculatus is a species of beetle in the family Cerambycidae. It was described by Per Olof Christopher Aurivillius in 1908. It was described by Papua New Guinea.

References

quadrimaculatus
Beetles described in 1908